Roscoe Collegiate High School or RCHS is a 2A public high school located in Roscoe, Texas (USA). It is part of the Roscoe Independent School District located in north west Nolan County. In 2009, Roscoe Collegiate High School received the Texas Education Agency's Early College High School designation, making it the only rural school in Texas to be designated as such. In 2011, the school was rated "Recognized" by the Texas Education Agency.

Athletics
The Roscoe Collegiate Plowboys compete in the following sports:

Basketball
Cross Country
Football
Powerlifting
Track and Field

State titles
Basketball - 
2009(1A/D1)
Boys Track - 
1995(1A)
Football - 
None

References

External links
Roscoe ISD

Schools in Nolan County, Texas
Public high schools in Texas
Public middle schools in Texas